Metachroma angustulum is a species of leaf beetle. It is found in the United States.

References

Further reading

 

Eumolpinae
Articles created by Qbugbot
Beetles described in 1873
Taxa named by George Robert Crotch
Beetles of North America